Boris Khabarov (born 13 May 1934) is a Soviet sailor. He competed in the Dragon event at the 1972 Summer Olympics.

References

External links
 

1934 births
Living people
Soviet male sailors (sport)
Olympic sailors of the Soviet Union
Sailors at the 1972 Summer Olympics – Dragon
Place of birth missing (living people)